Karotomorpha is a genus of parasites with a flagellum structure. This organism can infect a variety of higher life forms including a number of amphibians. For example, this genus is known to be a parasite of the rough-skinned newt, a widespread newt in the western USA.

References 

Placidozoa
Heterokont genera
Parasitic SAR
Parasites of amphibians